Glen Atle Larsen (born 24 August 1982) is a Norwegian footballer who plays for Skeid.
He is primarily a midfielder but can also play as a forward.

Larsen was born in Stord, Sunnhordland. He started his career in the clubs Finnås and Bremnes in Bømlo. After playing for Haugesund, he started a career in Estonia with Flora Tallinn and Valga. He joined Vålerenga in Norway, soon went on loan to Nybergsund before going on to Dundee and St Patrick's Athletic In Scotland and Ireland. At Dundee his only goal for the club came in a dramatic 4-4 draw with Hibernian. He played 5 games for Kongsvinger in 2008, and left the club in 2009.

In 2010, he played for Kolding before joining Skeid in the summer.

References

1982 births
Living people
People from Stord
Norwegian footballers
FK Haugesund players
FC Flora players
FC Valga players
Vålerenga Fotball players
Nybergsund IL players
Dundee F.C. players
St Patrick's Athletic F.C. players
Kongsvinger IL Toppfotball players
Kolding FC players
Skeid Fotball players
Scottish Premier League players
League of Ireland players
Norwegian expatriate footballers
Expatriate footballers in Estonia
Expatriate footballers in Scotland
Expatriate association footballers in the Republic of Ireland
Expatriate men's footballers in Denmark
Norwegian expatriate sportspeople in Estonia
Norwegian expatriate sportspeople in Scotland
Norwegian expatriate sportspeople in Ireland
Norwegian expatriate sportspeople in Denmark
Association football midfielders
Bremnes IL players
Sportspeople from Vestland
Meistriliiga players